BBGM is an American architecture and interior design firm. It is based in Washington, DC, and employs about 50 architects and interior designers. It specializes in the design of hotel, office and large residential buildings.

History

In the 1990s the firm began work on hotel projects, including renovation of the St. Regis Hotel, the Sheraton Center and the Sheraton City Square in New York City, and the Hamilton Crowne Plaza, the Omni Shoreham Hotel, the Hay-Adams Hotel, and the Sofitel Lafayette Square renovations in Washington, D.C. By 2004 the firm had worked on almost forty hotels in the D.C. area.

In 1994, BBGM took part in designing the expansion for The Peninsula Hong Kong, and has also worked on projects in China, the United Arab Emirates, the Caribbean, Egypt, India, Mexico, Singapore, Russia, Australia, South America, Canada, and the United States.

The company's name was simplified to BBGM in 2013.

In 2015, BBGM merged with Arizona-based luxury hotel design firm Monogram.

Selected projects
 Hay-Adams Hotel, Washington, D.C
 Suite 5000 of the Mandarin Oriental, New York, N.Y.
 Mandarin Oriental, Washington, D.C.
 Lotte New York Palace Hotel, New York, N.Y.
 Martin Katz Jewel Suite (designed in collaboration with Martin Katz)
 Dom Pérignon Suite
 Omni Shoreham Hotel, Washington, D.C.
 Plaza Hollywood, Hong Kong, China
 Rosewood Abu Dhabi, Abu Dhabi, United Arab Emirates
 Sofitel New York Hotel, New York, N.Y.
 Turnberry Tower, Arlington, V.A.
 W Hotel Washington, Washington, D.C.
 Washington Marriott Marquis, Washington, D.C.
 Watergate Hotel, Washington, D.C.
 Wharf Intercontinental, Washington, D.C.
 Willard InterContinental Washington, Washington, D.C.
 Workhouse Arts Center, Lorton, V.A.

Selected awards and honors
 Hotel Business Design
 Top Architects and Designers of 2014 (#24)
 Interior Design
 Top 10 Fastest Growing Firms of 2014 (#7)
 2010 Hospitality Giants (#10) 
 2009 Hospitality Giants (#9)
 Top 10 Most Impressive Penthouses of 2014
 CNBC, Turnberry Tower
 AIA DC 2011 Chapter Design Awards
 Merit Award, Lorton Workhouse Arts Center, Historic Resources Category
 Merit Award, W Hotel Washington, Historic Resources Category
 2007 White House Closing the Circle Award,
 Pentagon Library & Conference Center, Sustainable Design & Construction at the Pentagon
 Emporis
 Emporis Skyscraper Award 2000, Sofitel New York Hotel

References

External links 
 

Privately held companies of the United States
Companies based in Washington, D.C.
Architecture firms based in Washington, D.C.
Companies established in 1987
Architecture firms of the United States